Edward F. Gossett (January 15, 1930 – January 21, 1985), better known as Eddie Graham, was an American professional wrestler. He was also the promoter and booker for Championship Wrestling from Florida and President of the NWA in the 1970s.

Early life 
Edward Gossett was born on January 15, 1930, in Dayton, Tennessee, blind in one eye. He lived in a troubled household and sold newspapers and eggs to make a living while in Chattanooga at the age of 12. The newspaper provided YMCA gym memberships to newsboys, allowing him to receive physical training.

Professional wrestling career

Texas 
Gossett started wrestling in 1947 in Texas at the age of 17 after being trained by Clarence "Cowboy" Luttrall. He was occasionally billed as the brother of "Nature Boy" Buddy Rogers under the name of Rip Rogers. He lost a loser-leaves-town match to Pepper Gomez in May 1958 in Texas.

Tag team wrestling 

In June 1958, he changed his ring name, adopting the persona of Eddie Graham, who was billed as the "brother" of Dr. Jerry Graham and "Crazy" Luke Graham (Superstar Billy Graham would later join the group of brothers). Jerry and Eddie were a very successful villainous tag team on the east coast of the United States. They had popular feuds with teams such as the Fabulous Kangaroos, the Bastien Brothers, Mark Lewin and Don Curtis, and Antonino Rocca and Miguel Pérez. They held the [[WWWF United States Tag Team Championship|NWA United States Tag Team Championship (Northeast version)]] together in Capitol Wrestling (the forerunner of World Wrestling Entertainment) four times, winning the belts three times in victories over Lewin and Curtis, and once against Red and Lou Bastien.

 Florida and NWA President 
In the spring of 1960, Eddie left the team and went to the National Wrestling Alliance's territory in Florida to wrestle. While there, in 1966, he had a feud with Professor Boris Malenko. Eddie took over booking and promoting for Championship Wrestling from Florida in 1971. He wrestled in tag team matches with his son, Mike Graham, until 1977, when he retired from the ring due to health problems. Graham returned to the ring a year later. In 1979, he defeated Killer Khan by pinfall after the referee was knocked out and subsequent interference by Mr. Hito and Kazuo Sakurada on Khan's behalf was fought off by his son Mike and Ray Stevens. Graham's last recorded match was against Terry Funk on March 3, 1982, which was ruled a draw.

He was the President of the NWA from 1976 to 1978, thanks in part to Gordon Solie and Dusty Rhodes. Graham was absent as NWA President in 1977 and 1978 due to serious health problems he suffered from, and was forced to step down as a result.

 Personal life 
In 1968, Graham was lacing his boots in the locker room when a 75-lb steel window fell on his head, detaching both of his retinas and causing him an injury that required three hundred stitches. The Florida Legislature awarded him $23,000 for the incident. According to Jim Wilson in his book Chokehold, Graham's eyesight was poor because of blade jobs, and because he needed surgery to correct the problem and could not afford the money, he had some wrestlers tamper with the window in order to pass it off as though it was the responsibility of the building. This allegation is disputed by eyewitnesses. Also, "blading" does not cause eye damage according to noted optometrist Dr. Robert W. McCullough and other eye doctors. Due to the injury, Graham was unable to wrestle for fifteen months.

Graham made contributions to a number of charitable causes, as chief of the Florida Boys and Girls Ranch Villa. In 1957, Graham, C.P. “Cowboy” Luttrall, and Hillsborough Sheriff Ed Blackburn began efforts to establish the organization. Graham donated funds from every Championship Wrestling from Florida show to the Villa, bringing in a reported $100,000, also donating to high school and college level amateur wrestling events.

 Death and legacy 
Graham remained as the promoter in Florida until January 21, 1985, when he committed suicide by gunshot after a lifelong battle with alcoholism and depression. It is believed that Graham’s participation in a land deal gone wrong led to him needing to raise over $500,000, including financial and marriage problems contributed to his death. His son Mike and grandson Stephen committed suicide in similar manners on October 19, 2012, and December 14, 2010, respectively.

He was posthumously inducted into the WWE Hall of Fame on March 29, 2008 by Dusty Rhodes, while his son, Mike Graham, accepted the honor on behalf of his father.

 Championships and accomplishments 
 Capitol Wrestling Corporation / World Wrestling Entertainment
 NWA United States Tag Team Championship (Northeast version) (4 times) - with Jerry Graham
 Hall of Fame (Class of 2008)
 Championship Wrestling from Florida
 NWA Brass Knuckles Championship (Florida version) (2 times, inaugural)
 NWA Florida Heavyweight Championship (1 time)
 NWA Florida Tag Team Championship (1 time) - with Mike Graham
 NWA Southern Heavyweight Championship (Florida version) (3 times)
 NWA Southern Tag Team Championship (Florida version) (2 times) - with Don Curtis (1) and Lester Welch (1)
 NWA United States Tag Team Championship (Florida version) (2 times) - with Dick Steinborn
 NWA World Tag Team Championship (Florida version) (7 times) - with Ike Eakins (1), Sam Steamboat (3), Bob Orton (2), and Jose Lothario (1)
 Japan Wrestling Association
 All Asia Tag Team Championship (1 time) - with Killer Karl Kox
 Mid-Atlantic Championship Wrestling / World Championship Wrestling
 NWA Southern Tag Team Championship (Mid-Atlantic version) (1 time) - with Sam Steamboat
 WCW Hall of Fame (Class of 1993)
 Mid-South Sports
 NWA Georgia Tag Team Championship (1 time) - with Mike Graham
 World Heavyweight Championship (Georgia version) (1 time)
 Midwest Wrestling Association
 MWA World Junior Heavyweight Championship (1 time)
 National Wrestling Alliance
 NWA Hall of Fame (Class of 2006)
 NWA Mid-America
 NWA Southern Tag Team Championship (Mid-America version) (2 times) - with Roy Welch
 NWA World Tag Team Championship (Mid-America version) (1 time) - with Sam Steamboat
 Professional Wrestling Hall of Fame
 Class of 2018
 Southwest Sports, Inc.
 NWA Texas Tag Team Championship (1 time) - with Johnny Valentine
 Western States Sports
 NWA Southwest Tag Team Championship (3 times) - with Art Nelson
 NWA World Tag Team Championship (Amarillo version) (4 times) - with Art Nelson (2), Dory Funk (1) and Sam Steamboat (1)
 World Wrestling Entertainment
 WWE Hall of Fame (Class of 2008)
 Wrestling Observer Newsletter''
 Wrestling Observer Newsletter Hall of Fame (Class of 1996)

References

External links 
 
 WWE Hall of Fame profile of Eddie Graham
 Tampa Bay Tribune

1930 births
1985 suicides
20th-century American male actors
American male professional wrestlers
Championship Wrestling from Florida
People from Chattanooga, Tennessee
Professional Wrestling Hall of Fame and Museum
Professional wrestlers from Florida
Professional wrestlers from Tennessee
Professional wrestling promoters
Professional wrestling trainers
Suicides by firearm in Florida
Sportspeople from Tampa, Florida
WWE Hall of Fame inductees
Multiple gunshot suicides
20th-century professional wrestlers
All Asia Tag Team Champions
NWA Florida Heavyweight Champions
NWA Southern Heavyweight Champions (Florida version)
NWA Brass Knuckles Champions (Florida version)
NWA World Tag Team Champions (Florida version)
NWA United States Tag Team Champions (Florida version)
NWA Georgia Tag Team Champions